Chalcotropis is a genus of jumping spiders that was first described by Eugène Louis Simon in 1902.

Species
 it contains ten species, found only in Asia and on the Polynesian Islands:
Chalcotropis acutefrenata Simon, 1902 (type) – Indonesia (Java)
Chalcotropis caelodentata Merian, 1911 – Indonesia (Sulawesi)
Chalcotropis caeruleus (Karsch, 1880) – Philippines
Chalcotropis celebensis Merian, 1911 – Indonesia (Sulawesi)
Chalcotropis decemstriata Simon, 1902 – Philippines
Chalcotropis insularis (Keyserling, 1881) – Tonga
Chalcotropis luceroi Barrion & Litsinger, 1995 – Philippines
Chalcotropis pennata Simon, 1902 – India
Chalcotropis praeclara Simon, 1902 – Philippines
Chalcotropis radiata Simon, 1902 – Indonesia (Sulawesi)

References

Fauna of Southeast Asia
Salticidae
Salticidae genera
Spiders of Asia